Kevin Holzweiler (born 16 October 1994) is a German professional footballer who plays as a right winger for Rot-Weiss Essen.

Career
Holzweiler made his professional debut in the 3. Liga for Viktoria Köln on 20 July 2019, starting in the away match against Hansa Rostock. He scored the second goal for Köln, reducing the deficit to 3–2, with the match finishing as a 3–3 draw.

References

External links
 
 
 

1994 births
Living people
People from Jülich
Sportspeople from Cologne (region)
Footballers from North Rhine-Westphalia
German footballers
Germany youth international footballers
Association football wingers
3. Liga players
Regionalliga players
Borussia Mönchengladbach II players
FC Viktoria Köln players
Rot-Weiss Essen players